Stanley Haynes (1906–1958) was a British film producer and screenwriter. He also directed one film, the 1946 period drama Carnival. He collaborated with David Lean at Cineguild Productions in the late 1940s. He was married to the actress Rosalyn Boulter.

Selected filmography
 The Man Behind the Mask (1936)
 Everything Is Rhythm (1936)
 One Good Turn (1936)
 Action for Slander (1937)
 Storm in a Teacup (1937)
 South Riding (1938)
 One of Our Aircraft Is Missing (1942)
 The Way Ahead (1944)
 Carnival (1946)
 Oliver Twist (1948)
 The Passionate Friends (1949)
 Madeleine (1950)
 Scrooge (1951)
 The Blue Parrot (1953)
 Dangerous Cargo (1954)

References

Bibliography
 Phillips, Gene. Beyond the Epic: The Life and Films of David Lean. University Press of Kentucky, 2006.

External links

1906 births
1958 deaths
Writers from Birmingham, West Midlands
British screenwriters
British film producers
British film directors
20th-century British screenwriters